Caroline Craig (born 30 April 1975 in Melbourne, Victoria, Australia) is an Australian actress, based in New York City. Caroline completed a BA at Melbourne University before graduating from NIDA (National Institute of Dramatic Art) in 1999.

Career

Television
Caroline first appeared as series regular Sergeant Tess Gallagher in Channel Seven's drama series Blue Heelers (2000 - 2003). In 2008 she appeared as Detective Jacqui James in Underbelly, and has since narrated the Underbelly series for Channel Nine. Most recently she played the role of Matron Grace Wilson in the ABC1 mini series ANZAC Girls, which screened in 2014.

Stage
Since graduating from NIDA, Caroline has worked for Melbourne Theatre Company, Sydney Theatre Company, State Theatre Company of South Australia, Bell Shakespeare Company, Malthouse Theatre, Melbourne and Griffin Theatre Company. Caroline has also directed a number of independent theatre productions including S-27 for Griffin Independent. In 2013 Caroline performed in Yes, Prime Minister, touring Australia and New Zealand.

Filmography

References

External links
 

1975 births
Actresses from Melbourne
Australian television actresses
Living people
People educated at Geelong Grammar School
People educated at Melbourne Girls Grammar
National Institute of Dramatic Art alumni
University of Melbourne alumni
University of Melbourne women